Shigeki Osawa   (born May 2, 1986) is a Japanese professional mixed martial artist who competes in the featherweight division.

Mixed martial arts career

Background

Osawa is a training partner of Japanese MMA veteran Michihiro Omigawa.

Osawa is a successful wrestler. Amongst his successes was his participation in the 8th World University Wrestling Championship in Greece where he won gold in the 60 kg division. He also won the All-Japan Freestyle Wrestling Championship 60 kg division in 2007, which gave him his entry into Sengoku.

Sengoku

In May 2009, Osawa made his Sengoku debut at Sengoku 8 against Kota Ishibashi. Osawa won the bout via unanimous decision (20–18, 20–19, 20–19).

Three months later, Osawa returned at Sengoku 9 against Toru Harai. Late in the first round, Osawa defeated Harai via TKO (punches).

After defeating Ki Hyun Kim at Sengoku 10, Osawa faced Ronnie Mann at Sengoku 11. Mann dominated the fight and claimed a unanimous decision victory, handing Osawa his first professional loss.

At Sengoku 12, Osawa returned to face Kyung Ho Kang. In another three round fight, Osawa once again won via decision.

In June 2010, Osawa faced Katsuya Toida at Sengoku 13. In the third round, the bout was ended after accidental kicks to the groin by Toida and ruled a "no contest".

Since his last fight with Sengoku, Osawa has competed in Pancrase, ZST, RINGS, Shooto, and Grachan.

Mixed martial arts record

|-
| Win
| align=center| 14–6–3 (1)
| Caol Uno
| TKO (punches)
| Shooto: Professional Shooto 7/26
| 
| align=center| 2
| align=center| 4:03
| Tokyo, Japan
| 
|-
| Win
| align=center| 13–6–3 (1)
| Wataru Miki
| Decision (unanimous)
| Shooto: 1st Round 2015
| 
| align=center| 3
| align=center| 5:00
| Tokyo, Japan
| 
|-
| Win
| align=center| 12–6–3 (1)
| Keiji Sakuta
| TKO (punches)
| Grachan: Grachan 15
| 
| align=center| 3
| align=center| 4:15
| Tokyo, Japan
| 
|-
| Loss
| align=center| 11–6–3 (1)
| Joji Mikami
| KO (punch)
| Vale Tudo Japan: VTJ 6th
| 
| align=center| 1
| align=center| 2:01
| Ota, Tokyo, Japan
| 
|-
| Win
| align=center| 11–5–3 (1)
| Satoshi Murata
| TKO (doctor stoppage)
| Grachan 14 - Mach Matsuri
| 
| align=center| 1
| align=center| 3:34
| Tokyo, Japan
| 
|-
| Draw
| align=center| 10–5–3 (1)
| Fumiya Sasaki
| Draw (majority)
| Shooto - 4th Round 2014
| 
| align=center| 2
| align=center| 5:00
| Tokyo, Japan
| 
|-
| Win
| align=center| 10–5–2 (1)
| Kazuhiro Ito
| Decision (unanimous)
| Shooto - 1st Round 2014
| 
| align=center| 3
| align=center| 5:00
| Tokyo, Japan
| 
|-
| Loss
| align=center| 9–5–2 (1)
| Akiyo Nishiura
| Decision (split)
| Vale Tudo Japan - VTJ 3rd
| 
| align=center| 3
| align=center| 5:00
| Tokyo, Japan
| 
|-
| Win
| align=center| 9–4–2 (1)
| Kazuya Satomoto
| TKO (doctor stoppage)
| Shooto - 1st Round 2013
| 
| align=center| 2
| align=center| 3:44
| Tokyo, Japan
| 
|- 
| Loss
| align=center| 8–4–2 (1)
| Yoshifumi Nakamura
| Decision (majority)
| Shooto: Gig Tokyo 12
| 
| align=center| 3
| align=center| 5:00
| Tokyo, Japan
| 
|-
| Win
| align=center| 8–3–2 (1)
| Hiroyuki Abe
| TKO (punches)
| Shooto: 10th Round
| 
| align=center| 1
| align=center| 4:12
| Tokyo, Japan
| 
|-
| Loss
| align=center| 7–3–2 (1)
| Yusuke Yachi
| Decision (unanimous)
| Shooto: 3rd Round
| 
| align=center| 3
| align=center| 5:00
| Tokyo, Japan
| 
|-
| Win
| align=center| 7–2–2 (1)
| Young Sam Jung
| TKO (punches)
| Rings: Battle Genesis Vol. 9
| 
| align=center| 2
| align=center| 4:34
| Tokyo, Japan
| 
|-
| Loss
| align=center| 6–2–2 (1)
| Akitoshi Tamura
| Decision (unanimous)
| Shooto: Shooto the Shoot 2011
| 
| align=center| 3
| align=center| 5:00
| Tokyo, Japan
| 
|-
| Draw
| align=center| 6–1–2 (1)
| Shunichi Shimizu
| Draw
| Zst: Battle Hazard 5
| 
| align=center| 2
| align=center| 5:00
| Tokyo, Japan
| 
|-
| Draw
| align=center| 6–1–1 (1)
| Tomonari Kanomata
| Draw (unanimous)
| Pancrase: Passion Tour 10
| 
| align=center| 3
| align=center| 5:00
| Tokyo, Japan
| 
|-
| Win
| align=center| 6–1 (1)
| Masaomi Saito
| TKO (punches)
| Pancrase: Passion Tour 9
| 
| align=center| 1
| align=center| 1:42
| Tokyo, Japan
| 
|-
| NC
| align=center| 5–1 (1)
| Katsuya Toida
| No Contest (accidental kicks to the groin)
| World Victory Road Presents: Sengoku Raiden Championships 13
| 
| align=center| 3
| align=center| 1:35
| Tokyo, Japan
| 
|-
| Win
| align=center| 5–1
| Kyung Ho Kang
| Decision (unanimous)
| World Victory Road Presents: Sengoku Raiden Championships 12
| 
| align=center| 3
| align=center| 5:00
| Tokyo, Japan
| 
|-
| Loss
| align=center| 4–1
| Ronnie Mann
| Decision (unanimous)
| World Victory Road Presents: Sengoku 11
| 
| align=center| 3
| align=center| 5:00
| Tokyo, Japan
| 
|-
| Win
| align=center| 4–0
| Ki Hyun Kim
| Decision (unanimous)
| World Victory Road Presents: Sengoku 10
| 
| align=center| 2
| align=center| 5:00
| Saitama, Japan
| 
|-
| Win
| align=center| 3–0
| Toru Harai
| TKO (punches)
| World Victory Road Presents: Sengoku 9
| 
| align=center| 1
| align=center| 4:24
| Saitama, Japan
| 
|-
| Win
| align=center| 2–0
| Kota Ishibashi
| Decision (unanimous)
| World Victory Road Presents: Sengoku 8
| 
| align=center| 2
| align=center| 5:00
| Tokyo, Japan
| 
|-
| Win
| align=center| 1–0
| Hideo Matsui
| Decision (unanimous)
| Pancrase: Changing Tour 2
| 
| align=center| 2
| align=center| 5:00
| Tokyo, Japan
|

References

External links

Japanese male mixed martial artists
Featherweight mixed martial artists
Mixed martial artists utilizing shootboxing
Mixed martial artists utilizing freestyle wrestling
Japanese male sport wrestlers
1985 births
Living people
21st-century Japanese people